The Junior women's race at the 2001 IAAF World Cross Country Championships was held at the Hippodrome Wellington in Ostend (Oostende), Belgium, on March 24, 2001.  Reports onf the event were given in The New York Times, in the Herald, and for the IAAF.

Complete results for individuals,  for teams, medallists, and the results of British athletes who took part were published.

Race results

Junior women's race (5.9 km)

Individual

Teams

Note: Athletes in parentheses did not score for the team result

Participation
An unofficial count yields the participation of 126 athletes from 32 countries in the Junior women's race.  This is in agreement with the official numbers as published.

 (6)
 (4)
 (4)
 (4)
 (5)
 (4)
 (2)
 (6)
 (1)
 (4)
 (4)
 (5)
 (5)
 (4)
 (4)
 (5)
 (6)
 (6)
 (1)
 (3)
 (1)
 (2)
 (4)
 (5)
 (6)
 (2)
 (4)
 (2)
 (6)
 (6)
 (4)
 (1)

See also
 2001 IAAF World Cross Country Championships – Senior men's race
 2001 IAAF World Cross Country Championships – Men's short race
 2001 IAAF World Cross Country Championships – Junior men's race
 2001 IAAF World Cross Country Championships – Senior women's race
 2001 IAAF World Cross Country Championships – Women's short race

References

Junior women's race at the World Athletics Cross Country Championships
IAAF World Cross Country Championships
2001 in women's athletics
2001 in youth sport